Rym Airlines is an airline based in Oran, Algeria. Its main base is Oran Es Senia Airport.

History 

The airline was founded by Groupe BCIA to start operations in 2003. It had three Boeing 737-200 aircraft on order, but the transaction was cancelled. The airline ceased operations in 2005 because of the BCIA case, which began in 2003.

See also		
 List of defunct airlines of Algeria

References 

Airlines established in 2003
Defunct airlines of Algeria